Sodki Union is a union parishad of Kumarkhali Upazila, in Kushtia District, Khulna Division of Bangladesh. There are 34 villages and 25 mouzas in the union.

References

External links
 

Unions of Khulna Division
Unions of Kumarkhali Upazila
Unions of Kushtia District